The 2012 North Carolina Tar Heels football team represented the University of North Carolina at Chapel Hill as a member of Coastal Division of the Atlantic Coast Conference (ACC) during the 2012 NCAA Division I FBS football season. The team was led by first-year head coach Larry Fedora and played their home games at Kenan Memorial Stadium. The Tar Heels finished the season 8–4 overall and 5–3 in ACC play to tie for first in the Coastal Division with the Georgia Tech Yellow Jackets and the Miami Hurricanes. Due to NCAA sanctions imposed in the wake of the University of North Carolina at Chapel Hill football scandal, North Carolina was ineligible for the conference title and banned for postseason play for the 2012 season.

Sanctions from scandal

On March 12, 2012, the university was notified of penalties issued by the NCAA Committee on Infractions for violations discovered in the 2010 season. North Carolina was banned from all postseason play in 2012, including bowl games and the ACC Championship Game. Also, UNC was placed probation for three years and lost five scholarships per season for three seasons beginning with the recruiting class of 2013.

Recruiting
National Signing Day was on February 1, 2012 and was the first chance for high school seniors to officially declare which university or college they will be attending for their college career. North Carolina had 23 high school seniors sign a National Letter of Intent to play football with them. Terrance Knox and Shakeel Rashad both graduated from high school early and enrolled at UNC in January 2012.

Coaching staff
New football coach Larry Fedora officially took over as the head coach at UNC on January 1, 2012. He signed a 7-year contract worth more than $1.7 million annually. He takes over a team that is banned from a bowl game for the 2012–13 season.

Schedule

Game summaries

Elon

North Carolina started a new era under head coach Larry Fedora with the first shutout since beating Duke 38–0 to finish the 1999 season.  The last time UNC scored 62 points was in the 1995 season against Ohio, which is only 3 points shy of the school record.  Giovani Bernard scored 3 touchdowns (one rushing, one receiving, and one punt return), all before sitting out the entire second half of the game.  Carolina also completed passes to 14 different receivers, including one reception by quarterback Bryn Renner.  The Tar Heels also set a school and ACC record with 260 punt return yards during the game.

Wake Forest

Louisville

East Carolina

Idaho

Virginia Tech

Miami (FL)

Duke

NC State

Georgia Tech

Virginia

NFL Draft

References

North Carolina
North Carolina Tar Heels football seasons
North Carolina Tar Heels football